Holospira pasonis, common name robust holospira, is a species of air-breathing land snail, a terrestrial pulmonate gastropod mollusk in the family Urocoptidae.

Distribution 
This species is found in Texas, USA.

References

External links 
 Manual of Conchology. volume 15, Urocoptidae. pages 90-91.

Urocoptidae
Gastropods described in 1895